Ion Santo (born 12 March 1940) is a Romanian fencer. He competed in the team sabre event at the 1960 Summer Olympics.

References

1940 births
Living people
Romanian male fencers
Romanian sabre fencers
Olympic fencers of Romania
Fencers at the 1960 Summer Olympics